Holy Cross Catholic Cemetery is a cemetery in Thornhill, Ontario, owned and operated by the Roman Catholic Archdiocese of Toronto.

History
Holy Cross Catholic Cemetery opened in 1954 to handle growth of Catholics in Toronto requiring a Catholic burial in the greater Toronto area. 

It is named for the universal symbol of Christianity. 

Besides the crypt at St. Michael's, St. Paul's (cemetery operated from 1822 to 1857) and St. Mary's Church (emergency cholera burials from 1832 to 1834 predated the first church built in 1835) were the only churches with an attached cemetery within Toronto. St. Michael's Cemetery opened in 1855 as a larger and stand alone burial grounds. Mount Hope Catholic Cemetery was opened to relieve St. Michael's  in 1900 and was the last to be located within Toronto.

Holy Cross is responsible for St. Luke's Roman Catholic Cemetery c. 1846. Located off John Street next to Thornhill Cemetery and Ukrainian Catholic Church of Saint Volodymyr (formerly St. Luke's Roman Catholic Church).

Notable interments 

 Carl Brewer
 G. Raymond Chang
 Milt Dunnell
 Marshal McLuhan
 Jack Tunney
 Domenic Racco
 Emanuel Jaques
 Charles Sauriol

The cemetery is the resting place of the more recent and former Archbishop of Toronto:

 Philip Pocock d. 1984
 Gerald Emmett Carter d. 2003
 Aloysius Ambrozic d. 2011

See also

 St. Augustine's Seminary
 Mount Hope Catholic Cemetery
 St. Michael's Cathedral Basilica (Toronto)
 St. Paul's Basilica, former site of St. Paul's Cemetery 1822 to 1857 (last burial)
 St. Michael's Cemetery (Toronto)

References

Cemeteries in Ontario
Roman Catholic cemeteries in Canada
1954 establishments in Ontario